Beachs Corner is an unincorporated community in Bonneville County, Idaho, United States. It is named after Aaron Williams Beach 1847-1912 who owned a farm there. His home was located on the opposite corner lot South across the Yellowstone Highway. The farmland was Northwest on the other side of the highway.

References

Unincorporated communities in Bonneville County, Idaho
Unincorporated communities in Idaho